The drum wrench or bung wrench is a tool which is commonly used to open drum bungs and openings.
When unopened, a large drum's contents may be under enormous pressure. If a drum is opened without the proper tools and precautions, the pressure may escape suddenly and violently, causing injury. A drum wrench reduces pressure during the opening process. A drum wrench is a convenient tool for safely opening and removing materials drums, but they are not the only means of protection from the hazards of said drums. Some drums act as a vacuum with very low internal pressures, increasing the risk of the top "popping up" soon after opening.

See also
 44 or 55 gallon drum

References

Wrenches
Packaging